Naši furianti (in English: Our Swaggerers) is a Czech play based on a story by Ladislav Stroupežnický, performed for the first time in 1887. In 1937 a film adaptation was made, directed by Vladislav Vančura.

Story 
The story is set in 1869. It is a naturalistic depiction of Stroupežnický's home village of Cerhonice, named Honice na Písecku in the play.

Productions

National Theatre, Prague, First run 
Director - Rudolf Tesáček
Filip Dubský - Jiří Štěpnička
Marie Dubská - Johanna Tesařová
Václav - Jan Dolanský
Petr Dubský - Alois Švehlík
Jakub Bušek - Miroslav Donutil
Františka Bušková - Jitka Smutná
Veronika - Kristina Lukešová
Matěj Šumbal - Igor Bareš, Saša Rašilov
Marie Šumbalová - Taťjana Medvecká, Kateřina Burianová
Pavel Kožený - Petr Pelzer
Kašpar Šmejkal - Bronislav Poloczek, Karel Pospíšil
Valentin Bláha - Ondřej Pavelka
Josef Habršperk - David Prachař
František Fiala - Jan Hartl
Terezka - Hana Igonda Ševčíková
Kristýna - Gabriela Pyšná
Local Smith - Vlastimil Přáda
Karel Kudrlička - Saša Rašilov, Jan Bidlas
Tobiáš Nedochodil - Tomáš Stibor
Markytka - Jaromíra Mílová
Vojta - Milan Stehlík
Boss of Gendarme's from Rotice Town - Petr Motloch
Marek - Václav Postránecký
Rozárka - Hana Militká

National Theatre, Prague, 2nd run
Director -  Miroslav Macháček
Actors - *Actors - Luděk Munzar, Josef Kemr, Jana Hlaváčová, Václav Postránecký, Eva Klenová, Taťjana Medvecká, Jiří Vala, Blažena Holišová, Ivan Luťanský, Bedřich Prokoš, Josef Somr, Naděžda Gajerová, Zuzana Šavrdová, Milan Stehlík, Petr Kostka, Klára Jerneková, Emil Konečný, Jaroslav Mareš, Miroslav Doležal, Soběslav Sejk, Zuzana Talpová, Josef Velda, Eduard Pavlíček, Pavel Vondruška

National Theatre, Prague, 3rd run 
Director - Vítězslav Vejražka
Actors - Vítězslav Vejražka, Stanislav Neumann, Bohuš Záhorský, Jiří Dohnal, Vlasta Matulová, Jiřina Petrovická, Václav Švorc, Jarmila Krulišová, Josef Pehr, František Krahulík, Bořivoj Navrátil

References

External links 
Opinion (2004) in Czechoslovak Film Database
Opinion (1983) in ČSFD.cz
National Theatre Website

Czech plays
Czech literature
Comedy plays
1887 plays